The Cyprus A gas field is a Cypriot natural gas field that was discovered in 2011. It will begin production in 2015 and will produce natural gas and condensates. The total proven reserves of the Cyprus A gas field are around 7 trillion cubic feet (200×109m³) and production is slated to be around 300 million cubic feet/day (8.6×106m³).

See also

 Energy in Cyprus
 Aphrodite gas field

References

Natural gas fields in Cyprus